The Waray people (or the Waray-Waray people) are a subgroup of the  larger ethnolinguistic group Bisaya people, who constitute the largest Filipino ethnolinguistic group in the country. Their primary language is the Waray language (also called Lineyte-Samarnon), an Austronesian language native to the islands of Samar, Leyte and Biliran, which together comprise the Eastern Visayas Region of the Philippines. Waray people inhabit the most part of Samar where they are called Samareños/Samarnons, the northern part of the island of Leyte where they are called Leyteños, and the island of Biliran. On Leyte island, the Waray people occupy the northern part of the island, separated from the Cebuano language-speaking Leyteños by a mountain range in the middle of the island.

On the island of Biliran, Waray-Waray-speaking people live on the eastern part of the island facing the island of Samar; their Waray-Waray dialect is commonly referred to as Biliranon. On the island of Ticao, which belongs to the province of Masbate in the Bicol Region, Waray-Waray-speaking people live on most parts of the island; they are commonly referred to as Ticaonon. However, the Ticaonon have more affinity with the Masbateño-speaking people of Masbate, being their province-mates. The Bicolano language has more common vocabulary with the Waray-Waray language than with other Visayan languages (i.e. Cebuano or Ilonggo).

Area
The Waray people form the majority of the population in the provinces of Eastern Samar, Northern Samar, Samar while they form a significant population in Leyte, Southern Leyte, Biliran, and Sorsogon.

History
The Warays are descendants of Austronesian-speaking seafarers who settled the Philippine archipelago beginning in the Iron Age.

In 1521, the Warays of the east coast of Samar, who called themselves Ibabaonon, were the first Filipinos to be sighted by Europeans under the leadership of Ferdinand Magellan. The Warays were among the first Filipinos converted to Christianity. Paradoxically, they are also among the last Filipino ethnicities to retain indigenous practices alongside Roman Catholicism.

Religion
Most Warays are Catholic, with a minority professing Protestantism, Islam, traditional Waray beliefs, or having no religion.

Language
The Waray people speak the Waray, a major Visayan language. Many also speak Cebuano as their second language. Some people of Waray descent speak Waray as their second or third language, especially among emigrants to Metro Manila, other parts of the Philippines and elsewhere in the world.

Traditions
Many Waray traditions can be traced to pre-colonial times.  For example, the Kuratsa Dance, or Kuratsa de Mayor is a very popular traditional dance of the Waray-Waray at many social gatherings, especially weddings. It is very common throughout Samar. Initially thought to have originated from the la cucaracha (cockroach dance) of Mexico, it was later confirmed by the National Commission for Culture and the Arts that the dance was indeed indigenous Waray in origin, not Mexican. The dance depicts a courtship dance which exemplifies the movements of the rooster and the hen, which were prized commodities for the indigenous Waray people. Traditionally, the dance is played together with a rondalla or a live string band. The music used for the dance is complex, having a wide variety depending on the wishes of the musicians. In some cases, the rondalla also sings while the performers dance to the music.

In Waray tradition, a sarayaw or social dancing event is never complete without the kuratsa. The dance is so integral to Waray culture that it is also exhibited in birthdays, weddings, baptisms, and even political and sports events. Traditionally, the dance area for the dancers are leveled, and not elevated, so that the spectators may surround them, whether the location is indoor or outdoor. To begin the dance, the parag-adu (the person who pairs the dancers) calls out the dancers first. The pairs then proceed to the paseo. The first dance move begins with the siki-siki (foot steps) or the tinikud-tikud (heel steps). Both of which are extremely rapid steps that keep both foot near each other. The couple who dances the Kuratsa are showered with money by the people around them. Both dancers afterwards wave their arms sideways or a little overhead, arms together or in alteration. Afterwards, the men will perform the sarakiki step, a rapid vibrating step performance that depicts the agility of the rooster.

It includes mincing, skipping, hopping, and jumping combinations. Despite being brisque and rapid, the men are expected to execute the steps in a graceful manner where they seem to glide in space. For the women, they are expected to perform that languorous and wavy mabalud-balud steps. The basic format of the women's steps is based on a sub-step known as duon, which means 'to put weight on'. The usage of the duon makes the dancers of the mabalud-balud bounce with grace, if properly done. The best dancers of the mabalu-balud should be light, fluid, and fine in execution. As partners, the pairs should be synchronized with the moves that are designated as dual in nature. The pair dramatize the romantic palanat, a chasing pair step. The palanat depicts the man as chasing the women in pursue of love. The women are seen to reject the man initially, as to test if the man is serious in his pursuit. Once the man is rejected, it is expected for the man to turn back in grief, while the women will follow the man as if looking if the man is really in grief, all while executing the palanat. Once the grief has been proven, the dance proceeds to the dagit (swoop down steps) and wali (lift steps). The man afterwards will kneel and roll around while the woman manifests her prestige with poise as she sways and circles towards her partner. To make it more elaborate, there is also a gapus-gapusay or tying steps.

In gapus-gapusay, the dancers are tied with kerchief at separate times. The tied partner is only released once the free partner immobilizes the sabwag, or dropping money on the scarf laid at the center of the ground. The sabwag notably depicts the dowry. Afterwards, both partners woo each other through steps that differentiate the man and the woman. The man uses the parayaw (showing off steps), while the woman uses the flirtatious lubay-lubay (hip sway steps). The dance traditionally ends with all dancers expected to exhibit finesse in the art form. The kuratsa is notably used in the Waray wedding ritual known as bakayaw. The bride and the groom are expected to dance the kuratsa, followed by the ninang and ninong (the principal sponsors of the marriage). During a bakayaw, people are mandated by tradition to throw money towards the dancing bride and groom. The thrown money is known as gala, and is collected and offered by the groom to the bride as the precursor of a married life. The friends and family of the couple usually throws a lot of money towards the couple as the Warays believe that the more money showered upon them, the more blessings shall arrive for the couple. In 2011, the performing art was cited by the National Commission for Culture and the Arts as one of the intangible cultural heritage of the Philippines under the performing arts category that the government may nominate in the UNESCO Intangible Cultural Heritage Lists.

Universities
Tacloban City in Leyte is home to a campus of the University of the Philippines, Leyte Colleges, Leyte Normal University is also located in Tacloban.  There are numerous state universities serving the region, including Eastern Samar State University, Eastern Visayas State University, Samar State University and the largest both in terms of land area and curricular offerings in the whole region, the University of Eastern Philippines located in Catarman, Northern Samar.  There are also other colleges in (Western) Samar like St. Mary's College of Catbalogan, formerly Sacred Heart College and Samar College. Northwest Samar State University, formerly Tiburcio Tancinco Memorial Institute of Science and Technology and Samar State College of Agriculture and Forestry, offer courses that are needed in technology and business community.

Stereotypes
The Waray-Waray are often stereotyped as brave warriors, as in the popular phrase, meaning "Waray never back down from a fight". Most of the negative connotation of this stereotype however, which depicted Warays as violent and callous, were caused by the notorious Waray-Waray gangs.

They are also known as contented people, so much so that, during the Spanish era, they were often called lazy, for being contented to live in simplicity as farmers, and for making tuba palm wine from coconut nectar. Warays are also known for their love of music, in particular the Kuratsa, a courtship dance. Local artists often create Waray versions of popular songs, such as "An Bahal nga Tuba" that was based on a Mexican song.

Crops
The most important crop and major source of income for many is the coconut.  Other major agricultural products include rice and corn, while sugarcane, abaca, and tobacco are also grown. Cassava and camote (sweet potato) are grown as supplementary staple crops. Pineapple, banana, mangoes, and other fruit are grown year round, as are many vegetables and peanuts. In Eastern Samar, a root crop known as palawan is grown.  It is not common outside of that area, except in some parts of (Western) Samar like Basey and Marabut. Leyte is a big producer of bananas.

Farming/Fishing
Farming and fishing provide much of the livelihood of the Waray-Waray.  There is an impressive variety of seafood available.

Native wines are produced in the area, as in many places in the Philippines. The most common of these wines are tuba extracted from the coconut palm, "manyang" extracted from palm tree (common in the province of Northern Samar)  and pangasi, made from fermented rice.

See also 
 Tagalog people
 Kapampangan people
 Ilocano people
 Ivatan people
 Igorot people
 Pangasinan people
 Bicolano people
 Negrito
 Bisaya people
 Aklanon people
 Boholano people
 Capiznon people
 Cebuano people
 Cuyunon people
 Eskaya people
 Hiligaynon people
 Karay-a people
 Masbateño people
 Porohanon people
 Romblomanon people
 Suludnon
 Lumad
 Moro people

References

 
Ethnic groups in Samar
Ethnic groups in Leyte
Ethnic groups in Biliran